Brisbane Square Tower 2 is a proposed office building to be located at 266 George Street in Brisbane, Queensland, Australia.

The 36-storey, modern style, office building will be developed at the open plaza, known as Reddacliff Place, adjoining the existing Brisbane Square Tower. The site is located at the apex of the Queen Street Mall in the Brisbane CBD’s North Quarter Precinct and adjacent to the new Queens Wharf entertainment precinct. 
The amount of the ground floor plaza occupied by the development will be reduced as the architects have proposed a “suspended tower” with the building lobby elevated to the podium level.

The QSuper will be the anchor tenant precommitted for nearly half of the building (17,200sq m or 40%).

Development application was lodged with the Brisbane City Council in November 2017.
The project is forecast for completion in late 2020.

In late November, the Brisbane City Council put a protective measure on the site, as an emergency response to the development application, to prevent any future development proposals above Reddacliff Place.

See also

Brisbane Square
List of tallest buildings in Brisbane

References

External links
Building at The Skyscraper Center database

Proposed skyscrapers in Australia
Skyscrapers in Brisbane
Office buildings in Brisbane
Neomodern architecture
George Street, Brisbane
Skyscraper office buildings in Australia